Nenju Porukkuthillaiye (English: My Heart Is Bleeding) is a Tamil talk show  aired on Tamil television channel Kalaignar TV  network, hosted by John Dhanraj. The programme was started to bring a change in Indian society by discussing several issues faced by common peoples, their causes and possibilities of social justice.

Nenju Porukkuthillaiye was widely appreciated by several politicians and social activists for its social research and analysis, gathering positive feedbacks from the common people as well.

List of episodes 
Crime against women
School children's safety
Farmers suicide
Electricity problem in Tamil Nadu
Safety in ATM centres
Medical - service or business
Bank loan for education
Corporate development(Tamil Culture)

References

Indian television series